Himanshu Asnora (born 16 August 1995) is an Indian cricketer who plays for Uttar Pradesh.

References

External links
 

1995 births
Living people
Indian cricketers
Uttar Pradesh cricketers
Cricketers from Lucknow